On January 3, 2021, the 1st day of the 117th Congress and 2 months after the 2020 U.S. House elections, the incoming members of the U.S. House of Representatives held an election for speaker of the U.S. House of Representatives. It was the 127th U.S. speaker election since the office was created in 1789.

The incumbent speaker, Democrat Nancy Pelosi, was elected to a 4th (2nd consecutive) term, defeating Republican Kevin McCarthy 216–209, with two votes going to other individuals. As only 427 representatives in the 435-member House cast a vote (due to vacancies, absentees, or members voting present), 214 votes were necessary to win.



Process and conventions
The speaker of the House is the presiding officer of the United States House of Representatives. The House elects its speaker at the beginning of a new Congress (i.e. , after a general election) or when a speaker dies, resigns, or removed from the position intra-term. Since 1839, the House elected speakers by roll call. Traditionally, each party's caucus or conference selects a candidate for the speakership from among its senior leaders prior to the roll call. Representatives are not restricted to voting for the candidate nominated by their party, but generally do, as the outcome of the election effectively determines which party has the majority and consequently will organize the House. Representatives that choose to vote for someone other than their party's nominated candidate usually vote for another member within the party or vote "present".

Moreover, as the Constitution doesn’t explicitly state that the speaker must be an incumbent representative, it’s permissible for representatives to vote for someone who’s not a member of the House at the time, and non-members have received a few votes in various speaker elections over the past several years. Nevertheless, every person elected speaker has been a member.

To be elected speaker a candidate must receive a majority of the votes cast, as opposed to a majority of the full membership of the Housepresently 218 votes, in a House of 435. There have only been a few instances during the past century where a person received a majority of the votes cast, and thus won the election, while failing to obtain a majority of the full membership. It happened most recently in January 2015 (114th Congress), when John Boehner was elected with 216 votes (as opposed to 218). Such a variation in the number of votes necessary to win a given election might arise due to vacancies, absentees, or members being present but not voting. If no candidate wins a majority of the "votes cast for a person by name," then the roll call is repeated until a speaker is elected. Multiple roll calls have been necessary only 15 times since 1789; and, at the time, not since 1923 (68th Congress), when a closely divided House needed 9 ballots to elect Frederick H. Gillett speaker. Upon winning election the new speaker is immediately sworn in by the Dean of the United States House of Representatives, the chamber's longest-serving member.

Democratic Party

Candidate
 Nancy Pelosi, incumbent speaker of the House, former Minority Leader, and current representative from California's 12th congressional district.

Results
On November 17, 2020, Pelosi was nominated by voice vote unopposed .

Republican Party

Candidate
 Kevin McCarthy, incumbent House Minority Leader, former House Majority Leader, and current representative from California's 23rd congressional district.

Results 
On November 17, 2020, McCarthy was nominated by voice vote without opposition.

Election of the speaker 
The election for speaker took place on January 3, 2021, at the start of the 117th Congress. In a break with tradition due to the COVID-19 pandemic, all House members-elect did not gather in the chamber to vote and record their presence, but rather, were summoned to the chambers in 7 groups of about 72 people. Three members-elect were absent from the proceedings, and two seats were vacant at the time. Nancy Pelosi received a narrow majority of the 427 votes cast and was re-elected speaker; 3 people answered present when their names were called.

Representatives voting for someone other than their party's speaker nominee were:
 Conor Lamb, who voted for Hakeem Jeffries;
 Jared Golden, who voted for U.S. Senator Tammy Duckworth.

Answering present were Democrats Mikie Sherrill, Elissa Slotkin and Abigail Spanberger. Representatives absent were Democrat Alcee Hastings and Republicans Maria Elvira Salazar and David Valadao.

Notes

References

Speaker of the House election
Speaker
Speaker of the House election
Speaker of the House election
Nancy Pelosi
2021